Márcio Ravelli (born 27 February 1972) is a Brazilian cyclist. He competed in the men's cross-country mountain biking event at the 1996 Summer Olympics.

References

1972 births
Living people
Brazilian male cyclists
Brazilian mountain bikers
Olympic cyclists of Brazil
Cyclists at the 1996 Summer Olympics
Sportspeople from São Paulo